Cambridge United WFC is a women's only football club based in the city of Cambridge, England. The team compete in the FA Women's National Division One South East. The club play home games at St Neots Town F.C., which has a capacity of 3,500 (250 seated).

References

External links
 Official website
 Cambridge United Women 'gutted' they can't defend their county cup. Cambridgeshire Live. Published 28 February 2020.

Football clubs in Cambridgeshire
Sport in Cambridge
Women's football clubs in England